Velur is a village in the Thanjavur taluk of Thanjavur district, Tamil Nadu, India.

Demographics 

Velur had a total population of 441 people in 2001, including 214 men and 227 women. 1061/sex was the ratio. 54.22 percent of people could read.

References 

 

Villages in Thanjavur district